Oreodicastes is a genus of beetles in the family Carabidae, containing the following species:

 Oreodicastes aeacus Shpeley & Ball, 2000 
 Oreodicastes gounellei Maindron, 1906 
 Oreodicastes minos Shpeley & Ball, 2000 
 Oreodicastes rhadamanthus Shpeley & Ball, 2000 
 Oreodicastes subcyanea (Chaudoir, 1843) 
 Oreodicastes virginia Shpeley & Ball, 2001 
 Oreodicastes zikani Shpeley & Ball, 2001

References

Lebiinae